The Macau national futsal team represents Macau in international futsal competitions. It is controlled by the Macau Football Association.

Tournaments

FIFA Futsal World Cup
 1989 – Did not enter
 1992 – Did not enter
 1996 – Did not enter
 2000 – Did not qualify
 2004 – Did not qualify
 2008 – Did not qualify
 2012 – Did not qualify
 2016 – Did not enter
 2020 – Did not qualify

AFC Futsal Championship
 1999 – Did not enter
 2000 – Round 1
 2001 – Did not enter
 2002 – Did not enter
 2003 – Round 1
 2004 – Round 1 (host)
 2005 – Round 1
 2006 – Did not qualify
 2007 – Did not enter
 2008 – Did not qualify
 2010 – Did not qualify
 2012 – Did not qualify
 2014 – Did not qualify
 2016 – Did not enter

EAFF Futsal Championship
 2009 – Group stage
 2013 – Group stage

See also
 Sport in Macau

References

External links
 Macau Football Association website

Macau
National sports teams of Macau
Futsal in Macau